William John Higgins (1880 – October 7, 1943) was a lawyer, judge and political figure in Newfoundland. He represented St. John's East in the Newfoundland and Labrador House of Assembly from 1913 to 1928 as a member of the Newfoundland People's Party, Liberal Progressive party, Liberal-Labour-Progressive party and the Liberal-Conservative Progressive Party.

He was born in St. John's and was educated there. He worked as a clerk for a time. Higgins was called to the Newfoundland bar in 1910. He excelled in sports: he rowed in the Royal St. John's Regatta from 1901 to 1908, was the Newfoundland champion in the mile run for two years, was president of a number of sports leagues and president of the Newfoundland Amateur Athletic Association.

Higgins served as speaker for the Newfoundland assembly from 1918 to 1919. He was leader of the Liberal-Labour-Progressive Party from 1923 to 1924. He served in the Newfoundland Executive Council as Minister of Justice and Attorney General. After he retired from politics in 1928, he was named a judge in the Newfoundland Supreme Court. His son, Gordon, served in the Canadian House of Commons.

References
 

Speakers of the Newfoundland and Labrador House of Assembly
Newfoundland People's Party MHAs
1880 births
1943 deaths
Dominion of Newfoundland politicians
Dominion of Newfoundland judges
Attorneys-General of the Dominion of Newfoundland
Politicians from St. John's, Newfoundland and Labrador